Barry Archbold (born 11 December 1933) is a former Australian rules footballer who played for the Carlton Football Club in the Victorian Football League (VFL).

Archbold returned to Traralgon in 1956.

Notes

External links 

Barry Archbold's profile at Blueseum

1933 births
Carlton Football Club players
Living people
Australian rules footballers from Victoria (Australia)
Traralgon Football Club players